Holland Park Hawks FC  is a football club based in Camp Hill, Queensland. They are currently competing in the Football Queensland Premier League 2 the 4th division on the football pyramid of Australia. The club has youth teams which also compete in Football Queensland Academy Leagues which starts at U9 and ends at U18’s.

History
Holland Park Hawks Football Club was formed in 1976 with its home ground located at Whites Hill Reserve in Camp Hill. The club first entered senior competition in 2008 and achieved promotion by finishing top of the Metro League Division Two table in their first season.

Further promotions occurred in 2010, 2014 and 2015 enabling the club to climb from fifth tier of the Football Brisbane structure to the first tier in just eight seasons. Holland Park Hawks won each of these promotions by topping the league table to become premiers, and were champions three time after grand final victories. The three grand final wins were:
 2010 Metro League Division 1: Won 2–1 vs. Ridge Hills United
 2014 Capital League 2: Won 3–2 vs. Park Ridge
 2015 Capital League 1: Won 3–0 vs. North Pine

In 2010, Holland Park Hawks also had cup success, winning the Metro Cup competition (also known as the Veto Cup) after beating Souths United 2–1 in the Final.

Holland Park Hawks FC had a successful debut in the 2016 Brisbane Premier League season, finishing in third place on the league table and qualifying for the finals series in which they reached the preliminary final.

To build upon its success, the club applied to be part of the new National Premier Leagues structure which will commence in the 2018 season. In May 2017, Football Queensland announced Holland Park Hawks were among the 14 clubs accepted to form the Football Queensland Premier League for its initial season in 2018.

Seasons

Source:

The tier is the level in the Australian soccer league system

Honours
Capital League 1 – Premiers and Champions 2015
Capital League 2 – Premiers and Champions 2014
Metro League 1 – Premiers and Champions 2010 
Metro Cup – Winner 2010
Metro League 2 – Premiers 2008

References

External links
 Official Club Website
 Club Facebook Page

Soccer clubs in Brisbane
Brisbane Premier League teams
Association football clubs established in 1977
1977 establishments in Australia